The No. 15 ball grenade, also called the cricket ball grenade, was a grenade used by the British during World War I.

Overview

The No. 15 was a time-fused grenade. It was internally fragmented and incorporated a cast-iron body.

To light the grenade, the user had to remove a covering that was on the fuse, then strike an external Brock matchhead igniter against the fuse.

There were two types of fuses available; the five-second and the nine-second. The former was intended for throwing, while the latter was intended for catapults.

History

The No. 15 was one of the interim grenades created because of the problems associated with the No. 1 grenade. Unlike the others, the No. 15 had been created specifically for the Middle Eastern theatre of World War I, mostly for the fighting in the Dardanelles.

While crude, the No. 15 did well in the Dardanelles. In addition, it could easily be mass-produced; in September 1915, more than 200,000 No. 15s were created per week.

However, there were a few problems; the explosive charge was too large, which created smaller-than-expected fragmentation when the grenade exploded. In addition, it was considered too large because of its  circumference.  These problems were remedied with the No. 16 "oval grenade".

Battle of Loos

The No. 15 was first widely used in the Battle of Loos. Tacticians envisioned that the No. 15 would be useful in breaching German defenses and trench clearing. The No. 15 was used because production of the No. 5 "Mills bomb" was running seriously behind planned figures, and not enough of them could be supplied before the start of the Loos campaign.

When the Battle for Loos started, the No. 15 was beset with problems, in particular the wet conditions encountered made the fuse almost useless. It was estimated that approximately 18 out of 20 No. 15s failed to ignite due to inoperative fuses.

On November 20, 1915, the No. 15 and its cousin, the No. 16, were withdrawn from France and were replaced with the No. 5 "Mills bomb".

Variants

No. 16 "oval grenade"

The No. 16 is essentially an improved version of the No. 15. Instead of a ball shape, it has an oval shape and has less explosive charge. It was planned to completely replace the No. 15, but the defeat at Loos caused both the No. 15 and No. 16 to be withdrawn from service, as they both had the same lighting system.

References
Notes

Bibliography

External links
Diagram of the No. 15
Pictures of the No. 16

World War I grenades of the United Kingdom
Fragmentation grenades
Hand grenades of the United Kingdom